Geri is a surname. Notable people with the surname include:

Iska Geri (1920–2002), German film and television actress
Joe Geri (1924–2002), American football player
Janette Geri (1961–2018), Australian singer-songwriter
Ya'akov Geri (1901–1974), Israeli lawyer

See also
Geri (given name)